Les Tres Torres is a railway station situated under the Via Augusta in the Les Tres Torres neighbourhood of Barcelona. It is served by line L6 of the Barcelona Metro and lines S1 and S2 of the Metro del Vallès commuter rail system. All these lines are operated by Ferrocarrils de la Generalitat de Catalunya, who also run the station.

The line on which Les Tres Torres is located opened in 1863, but the first station on the site did not open until 1906. The current station was opened in 1952, when the line through the station was put underground.

See also
List of Barcelona Metro stations
List of railway stations in Barcelona

References

External links
 
 Information and photos about the station at Trenscat.com
 Information and photos about the station at TransporteBCN.es

Stations on the Barcelona–Vallès Line
Barcelona Metro line 6 stations
Railway stations in Spain opened in 1906
Railway stations in Spain opened in 1952
Transport in Sarrià-Sant Gervasi
Railway stations located underground in Spain